Jovan Lučić (born 26 May 1987) is a football goalkeeper, holding both Canadian and Serbian citizenship, who plays for Budućnost Dobanovci in the Serbian First League.

Career
Born in Vancouver, he played with the Serbian White Eagles in Vancouver.

During the second half of the 2013–14 season he played with FK Gorni Lisiče in the Macedonian First League.

In summer 2014 he joined Serbian SuperLiga side FK Rad, and during the winter break of the 2014–15 season he was loaned to FK Hajduk Beograd.

In winter 2016 he joined Vršac, played 14 games and saved the club from relegation. In summer 2016 he joined Serbian First League side Bežanija,

In winter 2017 he joined Radnički Beograd, and won the 2017 Belgrade Football Association Cup which was decided on penalties, and Lučić was decisive by stopping two, and subsequently was named the Man of the Match.

Personal life
Lučić's father, Dobrivoje, had been a soccer player in Yugoslavia, and his brother is NHL ice hockey player Milan Lucic.

Honours
Radnički Beograd
Belgrade FA Cup: 2016–17

Ice hockey

Lučić played Ice Hockey as well. He played for Burnaby based club White Eagles in the Adult Safe Hockey League. Lučić has played as a professional in the Serbian Hockey League, 2013 to 2015 for HK Beostar during his football winter breaks.

References

1987 births
Living people
Serbian footballers
Serbian expatriate footballers
Soccer players from Vancouver
Canadian ice hockey defencemen
Canadian soccer players
Canadian people of Serbian descent
Canadian expatriate soccer players
Ice hockey people from British Columbia
Serb diaspora sportspeople
Association football goalkeepers
FK Bežanija players
FK Brodarac players
FK BSK Batajnica players
FK Gorno Lisiče players
FK Hajduk Beograd players
FK Rad players
FK Radnički Beograd players
FK Vršac players
FK Zvezdara players
FC Botev Vratsa players
FC Arda Kardzhali players
FK Budućnost Dobanovci players
Serbian First League players
Serbian White Eagles FC players
Serbian expatriate sportspeople in North Macedonia
Serbian expatriate sportspeople in Bulgaria
Expatriate footballers in North Macedonia
Expatriate footballers in Bulgaria